Sir Thomas Walcot SL (6 August 1629 – 6 September 1685) was an English judge and politician.

Family
Thomas Walcot, born 6 August 1629, was the second son of Humphrey Walcot (1586-1650) and his wife Anne Docwra (d.1675), whose mother, Jane (née Peryam) Docwra, was the daughter of Sir William Peryam. Walcot had an elder brother, John, and a younger brother, William.

Career
Walcot entered Trinity College, Cambridge on 16 May 1646, became a member of the Middle Temple on 12 November 1647, and was called to the Bar there on 25 November 1653. On 15 February 1662 he became Attorney-General of Denbighshire and Montgomeryshire, and in April 1676 a Justice of the North Wales circuit. On 3 September 1679 he was elected Member of Parliament for Ludlow, becoming a Serjeant-at-Law in May 1680 and a Justice of the King's Bench on 22 October 1683, a position he held until his death on 6 September 1685.

Marriage and issue
On 10 December 1663, Walcot married Mary Littleton (d. 1695), the daughter of Sir Adam Littleton of Stoke St. Milborough, Shropshire. Their only child, Thomas Walcot, died in infancy.

Footnotes

References

External links
 Walcot, Thomas (1629-85), History of Parliament
 Walcot, John (1624-1702), History of Parliament

1629 births
1685 deaths
Justices of the King's Bench